Ilkeston Flyer is a bus route that operates between Cotmanhay and Derby via Ilkeston and Spondon. It is operated by Trent Barton.

History 
The route was introduced on 27 September 1999.

Prior to 2011, the route operated on a half-hourly frequency with one bus per hour operated by Trent Barton and the other by Felix Bus Services. On 26 June 2011, Trent Barton added an additional bus per hour, increasing the frequency to every 20 minutes. On 30 January 2012, Felix Bus Services' commercial routes were acquired by Wellglade Group, the parent company of Trent Barton. Trent Barton subsequently became the sole operator of the route.

On 26 March 2017, the fleet of buses operating the route was increased from four to six and the frequency was increased from every 20 minutes to every 15 minutes.

In December 2022 the route was diverted to avoid Cotmanhay Road after 18:00 following attacks on buses.

References 

Bus routes in England
Transport in Derbyshire